Odeni Igor George Jamabo (born 18 May 1995) is a Nigerian footballer who plays for Saudi Arabian club Al-Qaisumah.

References

1995 births
Living people
Nigerian footballers
Sportspeople from Port Harcourt
Aspire Academy (Senegal) players
K.A.S. Eupen players
Hapoel Ramat Gan F.C. players
Burgan SC players
Al Jahra SC players
Al-Qaisumah FC players
Belgian Pro League players
Liga Leumit players
Saudi First Division League players
Nigerian expatriate footballers
Expatriate footballers in Belgium
Expatriate footballers in Israel
Expatriate footballers in Kuwait
Expatriate footballers in Saudi Arabia
Nigerian expatriate sportspeople in Belgium
Nigerian expatriate sportspeople in Israel
Nigerian expatriate sportspeople in Kuwait
Nigerian expatriate sportspeople in Saudi Arabia
Association football midfielders